Ponura is a rural locality (a khutor) in Ivanchikovsky Selsoviet Rural Settlement, Lgovsky District, Kursk Oblast, Russia. Population:

Geography 
The khutor is located on the Kotlevka River at its confluence with the Vablya River (in the basin of the Seym), 64 km from the Russia–Ukraine border, 58 km north-west of Kursk, 14 km north-east of the district center – the town Lgov, 3.5 km from the selsoviet center – Ivanchikovo.

 Climate
Ponura has a warm-summer humid continental climate (Dfb in the Köppen climate classification).

Transport 
Ponura is located 18 km from the road of regional importance  (Kursk – Lgov – Rylsk – border with Ukraine) as part of the European route E38, 8 km from the road  (Lgov – Konyshyovka), 14 km from the road of intermunicipal significance  (38K-017 – Nikolayevka – Shirkovo), 2 km from the road  (38K-023 – Olshanka – Marmyzhi – 38N-362), 4 km from the nearest railway halt 565 km (railway line Navlya – Lgov-Kiyevsky).

The rural locality is situated 64 km from Kursk Vostochny Airport, 152 km from Belgorod International Airport and 266 km from Voronezh Peter the Great Airport.

References

Notes

Sources

Rural localities in Lgovsky District